Siddiq Khan can refer to:

 Siddiq Khan (umpire) (1947–2007), Pakistani cricket umpire
 Siddiq Khan Kanju (died 2001), Pakistani politician and Minister of State for Foreign Affairs
 Siddiq Hasan Khan (1832–1890), Indian Islamic scholar
 Muhammad Siddiq Khan (1910-1978), Bangladeshi academic and librarian

See also
 Sadiq Khan (disambiguation)